This list is of the Cultural Properties of Japan designated in the category of  for the Prefecture of Hiroshima.

National Cultural Properties
As of 1 July 2019, thirteen Important Cultural Properties (including two *National Treasures) have been designated, being of national significance.

Prefectural Cultural Properties
As of 18 April 2019, fifty-one properties  have been designated at a prefectural level.

See also
 Cultural Properties of Japan
 List of National Treasures of Japan (paintings)
 Japanese painting
 Hiroshima Prefectural Art Museum
 List of Historic Sites of Japan (Hiroshima)

References

External links
  Cultural Properties in Hiroshima Prefecture

Cultural Properties,Hiroshima
Cultural Properties,Paintings
Paintings,Hiroshima
Lists of paintings